The Wilderness Society is an Australian, community-based, not-for-profit non-governmental environmental advocacy organisation. Its vision is to "transform Australia into a society that protects, respects and connects with the natural world that sustains us."

It is a community-based organisation with a philosophy of nonviolence and consensus decision-making. While the Wilderness Society is a politically unaligned group, it actively engages the community to lobby politicians and parties.

The Wilderness Society comprises a number of separately incorporated organisations and has Campaign Centres located in all Australian capital cities (except Darwin and Canberra) and a number of regional centres.

History

The Wilderness Society was formed initially as the Tasmanian Wilderness Society (TWS) and was transition from the South West Tasmania Action Committee.

The group was originally established in 1976 from the members of the Lake Pedder Action Committee and the South West Tasmania Action Committee  Along with the United Tasmania Group, they had protested against the earlier flooding of Lake Pedder.  The group already had established interstate branches as the South West Tasmania Action Committee (in NSW branch the word "Action" was not included), so it was already a nationwide organisation. Significantly, all but four of the twenty-three people attending the inaugural meeting of the Tasmanian Wilderness Society in 1976 were members of the United Tasmania Group.

Following the success of the campaign against the Franklin Dam, and the national approach being more important due to other issues interstate, it became known as The Wilderness Society.

In the year 2005, Tasmanian forestry business Gunns brought a litigation case against the group in the Melbourne Supreme Court, in a case dubbed the "Gunns 20", claiming that the activities of environmental activists had damaged Gunns' profits. Gunns claimed $3.5 million from the Wilderness Society, but in March 2009, Gunns was ordered to pay the Wilderness Society $350,000 in damages and to cease the action.

Campaigns 
The Wilderness Society spent considerable energy in its first decades of existence arguing that wilderness was a specific quality in parts of Australia's environment that was vital to preserve for future generations. The political response in most states of Australia is that there are now wilderness inventories and acknowledgement of areas of wilderness.

The Wilderness Society's campaigns have included:
 the Franklin river
 stopping logging in old growth forests
 preventing destruction of endangered species habitats;
 protecting Queensland's Wild Rivers and Cape York Peninsula;
 nationwide campaign to mitigate the effects of climate change keep fossil fuels in the ground; 
 the Kimberley Campaign; as part of its long-running campaign against a proposal to industrialise the James Price Point headland near Broome, the organisation presented a concert on 5 October 2012. The concert featured performances from The John Butler Trio, Clare Bowditch and Missy Higgins, and a speech by the former leader of the Australian Greens and former TWS director, Dr Bob Brown. 
 since 2018 they have been focused on New Nature Laws - campaigning for strong, national nature laws and an independent watchdog agency to enforce these

Funding
Traditionally fundraising was performed through The Wilderness Society Shops. The shops were particularly popular for their calendars and posters by photographers such as Peter Dombrovskis and Olegas Truchanas, and were also central locations for the public to make donations and for members to meet.

Since the rise of the internet, fundraising has increasingly become centralised around internet based activities, such as the TWS website, online store and extensive email lists, although it also still contacts supporters through regular postal communications as well. 

The Wilderness Society now raises funds through a number of sources, mainly donations, including advocacy gifts and gifts in wills (bequests), subscriptions from members, grants, sales of merchandise, and interest and other investment income. For the 2020 financial year the Society specifically had a total income of $12,160,560. The majority of this is raised through donations (88%), bequests (3.9%), members subscriptions and merchandise (1%) and from events (1%). In 2020 the Wilderness Society also received $643,000 in COVID-19 relief subsidies.  For the same year total expenses were $10,201,241.

Political involvement
The inaugural director of The Wilderness Society was Kevin Kiernan, followed by Norm Sanders, who was later elected to the seat of Denison in the Tasmanian Parliament in 1980 for the Australian Democrats. He was Australia's first parliamentarian to be elected on an environmental platform. Bob Brown, became the director of The Wilderness Society in 1978, and with him the group increased their influence on Tasmanian politics. Brown was elected to the Tasmanian parliament in 1983 to fill the vacancy left when Sanders resigned his seat, and with the group of fellow conservationists elected subsequently, he went on to become part of the political party known as the Tasmanian Greens. Brown was later elected to represent Tasmania and the Greens in the Senate in the Federal parliament.

While The Wilderness Society has worked with the Australian Greens on certain campaigns, it is not affiliated with them or any other political party, as a politically unaligned environmental non-government organisation.

Wilderness Journal
The society publishes the Wilderness Journal, which covers a wide variety of stories about nature and people. Topics include the communities and forests of East Gippsland, a photo diary by Ben Baker of a road trip through bushfire damaged regions, a story about Marina DeBris and the ugly beauty of our trash, attempts to restore the giant kelp forests of Tasmania, and a journey into Mirning country, the coast and waters of the Great Australian Bight.

References

Further reading
Gee, H and Fenton, J. (Eds) (1978)  The South West Book – A Tasmanian Wilderness Melbourne, Australian Conservation Foundation. 
 Lines, William J. (2006) Patriots : defending Australia's natural heritage  St. Lucia, Qld. : University of Queensland Press, 2006.  
Neilson, D. (1975)  South West Tasmania – A land of the Wild. Adelaide. Rigby.

External links
The Wilderness Society official website
The Wilderness Journal
History and Key Successes of the Wilderness Society

 
Environmental organisations based in Australia
Nature conservation organisations based in Australia
Wilderness
South West Tasmania
Environment of Tasmania
Tasmanian Wilderness Society
1983 establishments in Australia